Soyuz T-10 was the fifth expedition to the Salyut 7 space station. It entered a darkened and empty station because of the loss of Soyuz T-10a. It was visited by the sixth and seventh expeditions. During the course of the cosmonauts stay, three extravehicular activities took place to repair a fuel line.

During their multiple spacewalks to perform maintenance on the station, the crew set a record for spacewalk hours.

Crew

Backup crew

Mission parameters 
 Mass: 6850 kg
 Perigee: 199.0 km
 Apogee: 219.0 km
 Inclination: 51.6°
 Period: 88.7 minutes

Mission highlights 
Fifth expedition to Salyut 7. Visited by 6th and 7th expeditions. The three-person Mayak crew entered the darkened Salyut 7 station carrying flashlights. The cosmonauts commented on the burnt-metal odor of the drogue docking unit. By 17 February 1984, Salyut 7 was fully reactivated, and the cosmonauts had settled into a routine. Physician Oleg Atkov did household chores and monitored his own health and that of his colleagues, who conducted experiments. During the previous year a fuel line on the station had ruptured. Kizim and Solovyov carried out three EVAs to try to fix the problem during the mission.

References

External links 

Crewed Soyuz missions
1984 in spaceflight
Spacecraft launched in 1984
1984 in the Soviet Union
India–Soviet Union relations